The 2007 UNLV Rebels football team represented the University of Nevada, Las Vegas during the 2007 NCAA Division I FBS football season. The season saw the Rebels win only 2 games for the fourth consecutive season.

Schedule

References

UNLV
UNLV Rebels football seasons
UNLV Rebels football